A Stroke of Midnight is the fourth novel in the Merry Gentry series by Laurell K. Hamilton.

Plot introduction

A faerie princess turned private investigator in a world where faeries are not only known to the general public, but are also fashionable, the title heroine is Princess Meredith NicEssus, also known as Merry Gentry. As niece to Andais, The Queen of Air and Darkness, she is a royal of the Unseelie Court. While her aunt tried to kill her as a child, she has since offered her the title as crown princess as the Court needs more heirs.

Plot summary
Following on almost immediately from the events of Seduced by Moonlight, A Stroke of Midnight begins with Merry and the Ravens attending a press conference in the sithen. This is highly unusual as the home of the sidhe is usually off-limits to the human press. However, it is felt that it is more secure than holding the conference elsewhere.

This opinion is challenged almost immediately by the deaths of Beatrice, one of the lesser fae, and a human reporter. Merry, assigned to solve the murders by her aunt, Queen Andais, opts to bring in human forensics in the hope that science might be able to succeed where magic has so far failed - and bring a murderer to justice.

The entire novel takes place within approximately one day.

Characters in A Stroke of Midnight

Major characters
A Stroke of Midnight features the following major characters.
 Andais - Queen of Air and Darkness, Merry's aunt, the sister of Essus, and mother of Cel. Andais is a war goddess, and the sadistic Queen of the Unseelie Court. Ruler of the male guard The Ravens, recently revealed as barren. Although she is a sadist and is widely believed to be insane, Andais appears to have the best interests of the Court somewhat at heart, and has sworn to abdicate her throne in favor of whichever of Cel or Merry can demonstrate themselves capable of producing new sidhe children. Her consort is Eamon.
 Doyle - Captain of The Ravens, once the Queens Darkness now part of Merry's guard, and included in her many lovers,  Part Sidhe, part Hell-Hound (Gabriel Ratchet, et al.), part phouka. 
 Frost - Raven, The Killing Frost, second in command. Was revealed that started life as Jacqual Frosti, Jack Frost, etc., is prejudiced against Seelie Court due to poor treatment at court because the other nobles were jealous of Frost's remaining in power due to his power in the minds of the humans. Has tendency to pout. Has recently come into godhead via Merry. Says recent powers used to belong to one he called master.  See Jack Frost.
 Galen - The youngest of the Ravens, Merry's best friend. Lineage is half-pixie and half Unseelie sidhe. Powers include subtle ability to have everyone like him. Extremely unpolitical, naive and idealistic, is voice of childhood reasoning for Merry. Unfortunately, letting go of those ideals is allowing Merry to survive. Mistranslation of a prophecy given from human prophet to Cel almost got Galen killed, as allies of Cel tried to assassinate Galen to prevent the prophecy.  
 Kitto - Goblin/sidhe hybrid, Seelie sidhe mother raped during goblin wars, snake-type goblin, given full sidhe status via sex with Merry, has Hand of Reaching.
 Meredith NicEssus/Merry Gentry - Title heroine, Princess of Flesh and Blood, Daughter of Essus 
 Nicca - Raven and Spy for Andais in Merry's home. Lineage is half-demifey and half Seelie Sidhe. Is apparently Cornish, due to being of Bucca-Dhu's Line (Revealed in Caress of Twilight) Has sprouted wings since wing-tattoos sprung out of back via sex with Merry. Is destined to be father of child with Biddy, formerly of Cel's Guard, via matchmaking ring. Was possessed by Dian Cecht, due to jealousy. Was cured via divine intervention.
 Rhys/Cromm Cruach - Raven, former God of Death. Film Noir buff. Was called Gwynfor "white lord of ecstasy and death" by Sage, 2nd hand has been seen when he killed Siun (Goblin) after Kitto hacked Siun to pieces. In Merry's dream, it is shown that Rhys will get both eyes back, apparently has magical hammer that can heal, raise armies of the dead. However, we are not sure whether dream was of past or future.  See Crom Cruach.

Other characters

Recurring characters include:

 Cathbodua - Female refugee from Cel's guard
 Dogmaela - Female refugee from Cel's guard
 Amatheon - Cel's creature
 Onilwyn - Former Cel guard
 Adair - Former Cel guard

Non-recurring characters include:

The death toll in A Stroke of Midnight includes:
 Beatrice
 Human photographer

Major themes
 The need for Merry to become pregnant by one of her Guards.
 Faerie politics, both within the Unseelie Court and between the Seelie and Unseelie Courts.
 The increase in powers of both Merry and her men.
 Merry's connection to the Goddess and the use of sex to bring about magical change.

Release details

External links
Official Site
Official Blog
Merry Gentry Index

Merry Gentry (series)
2005 American novels
American erotic novels
American horror novels
American fantasy novels
Fictional fairies and sprites
American alternate history novels

Ballantine Books books